The Cliff River is a  river on the Upper Peninsula of Michigan in the United States.  It is a tributary of Mountain Lake, which drains by Mountain Stream to Pine Lake, which in turn drains by the Pine River to Lake Superior.

See also
List of rivers of Michigan

References

Michigan  Streamflow Data from the USGS

Rivers of Michigan
Tributaries of Lake Superior